La Grandeza is a town and one of the 119 Municipalities of Chiapas, in southern Mexico.

As of 2010, the municipality had a total population of 7,272, up from 5,969 as of 2005. It covers an area of 52.2 km2.

As of 2010, the town of La Grandeza had a population of 1,044. Other than the town of La Grandeza, the municipality had 44 localities, none of which had a population over 1,000.

References

Municipalities of Chiapas